4×2=8 is the seventh studio album by South Korean singer Psy. The album was released digitally on May 10, 2017, by YG Entertainment, School Boy Records, and Republic Records.

This was Psy's last album under YG before his departure on May 15, 2018.

Background 
On May 1, YG Entertainment officially announced PSY's comeback by unveiling a poster of the comeback schedule, along with the title of the album 4×2=8. From May 4 to May 7, the track list was released, revealing the title track and featured artists, including Big Bang's G-Dragon and Taeyang, iKON's B.I and Bobby, Zico, Tablo, Lee Sung-kyung and Park Jin-young as a producer. One day before the release of the album, illustration teaser images were unveiled for each song.

Songs 
Most of the songs were written and composed by YG Entertainment artists, unlike his last album Chiljip Psy-da which didn't feature any YG artists. Psy stated in an interview that he wanted young blood for the album, and didn't want it to sound old, so he worked with B.I, who co-composed three tracks on the album. BigBang's Taeyang is featured on "Love"; iKon's B.I and Bobby on "Bomb"; and actress Lee Sung-kyung is featured on "Last Scene". Tablo participated in writing the lyrics and is featured on "Auto Reverse" with B.I. BigBang's G-Dragon took part in writing the lyrics for, and features on "Fact Assault", which is notable for having profanity, Psy stated "this track has so much profanity, and I don't even expect it to pass the censorship rating".

Music videos 
Actor Lee Byung-hun is featured in the music video of "I Luv It", while Apink's Son Na-eun played the title role in the music video of "New Face". The music videos cumulatively reached 8 million views within 14 hours, with "I Luv It" surpassing 4 million views and "New Face" surpassing 3.7 million views.

On January 1, 2018 "New Face" surpassed 100 million views.

Promotion 
PSY performed the songs in his new album for the first time on SBS's Inkigayo on May 14 and Fantastic Duo 2. He also promoted on JTBC's Knowing Bros sho and MBC's Radio Star show.

Track listing

Notes

Release history

Awards

External links 
 Psy "New Face" music video
 Psy "I Luv It" music video
 Psy "New Face" music video making 
 Psy "I Luv It" music video making

References 

2017 albums
Korean-language albums
Psy albums
YG Entertainment albums
Genie Music albums